The 2022 UEFA European Under-17 Championship qualifying competition was a men's under-17 football competition that determined the 15 teams joining the automatically qualified hosts Israel in the 2022 UEFA European Under-17 Championship final tournament. Players born on or after 1 January 2005 were eligible to participate.

Apart from Israel as the host, the remaining 54 teams entered the qualifying competition, where the original format consisted of two rounds: Qualifying round, which took place in autumn of 2021, and Elite round, which took place in spring of 2022.

Format
The qualifying competition would originally consist of the following two rounds:
Qualifying round: Apart from Netherlands and Spain, which receive byes to the elite round as the teams with the highest seeding coefficient, the remaining 52 teams are drawn into 13 groups of four teams. Each group is played in single round-robin format at one of the teams selected as hosts after the draw. The 13 group winners, the 13 runners-up, and the four third-placed teams with the best record against the first and second-placed teams in their group advance to the elite round.
Elite round: The 32 teams are drawn into eight groups of four teams. Each group is played in single round-robin format at one of the teams selected as hosts after the draw. The eight group winners and the seven runners-up with the best record against all teams in their group qualify for the final tournament.

The schedule of each group is as follows, with two rest days between each matchday (Regulations Article 20.04):

Tiebreakers
In the qualifying round and elite round, teams are ranked according to points (3 points for a win, 1 point for a draw, 0 points for a loss), and if tied on points, the following tiebreaking criteria are applied, in the order given, to determine the rankings (Regulations Articles 14.01 and 14.02):
Points in head-to-head matches among tied teams;
Goal difference in head-to-head matches among tied teams;
Goals scored in head-to-head matches among tied teams;
If more than two teams are tied, and after applying all head-to-head criteria above, a subset of teams are still tied, all head-to-head criteria above are reapplied exclusively to this subset of teams;
Goal difference in all group matches;
Goals scored in all group matches;
Penalty shoot-out if only two teams have the same number of points, and they met in the last round of the group and are tied after applying all criteria above (not used if more than two teams have the same number of points, or if their rankings are not relevant for qualification for the next stage);
Disciplinary points (red card = 3 points, yellow card = 1 point, expulsion for two yellow cards in one match = 3 points);
UEFA coefficient ranking for the qualifying round draw;
Drawing of lots.

To determine the four best third-placed teams from the qualifying round, the results against the teams in fourth place are discarded. The following criteria are applied (Regulations Articles 15.01 and 15.03):
Points;
Goal difference;
Goals scored;
Disciplinary points (total 3 matches);
UEFA coefficient ranking for the qualifying round draw;
Drawing of lots.

To determine the seven best runners-up from the elite round, all results are considered. The same criteria as above are applied (Regulations Articles 15.02 and 15.03).

Qualifying round

Draw
The draw for the qualifying round was held on 9 December 2020, 10:00 CET (UTC+1), at the UEFA headquarters in Nyon, Switzerland.

The teams were seeded according to their coefficient ranking, calculated based on the following:
2016 UEFA European Under-17 Championship final tournament and qualifying competition (qualifying round and elite round)
2017 UEFA European Under-17 Championship final tournament and qualifying competition (qualifying round and elite round)
2018 UEFA European Under-17 Championship final tournament and qualifying competition (qualifying round and elite round)
2019 UEFA European Under-17 Championship final tournament and qualifying competition (qualifying round and elite round)

Each group contained one team from Pot A, one team from Pot B, one team from Pot C, and one team from Pot D. Based on the decisions taken by the UEFA Emergency Panel, the following pairs of teams could not be drawn in the same group: Serbia and Kosovo, Bosnia and Herzegovina and Kosovo, Azerbaijan and Armenia.

Notes
Teams marked in bold have qualified for the final tournament.

Groups
The qualifying round is scheduled to be played by 16 November 2021.

Times up to 27 March 2022 are CET (UTC+1), thereafter times are CEST (UTC+2), as listed by UEFA (local times, if different, are in parentheses).

Group 1

Group 2

Group 3

All matches were abandoned by Azerbaijan. All opponents received a 3–0 win.

Group 4

Group 5

Group 6

Group 7

Group 8

Group 9

Group 10

Group 11

Group 12

Group 13

Ranking of third-placed teams
To determine the four best third-placed teams from the qualifying round which advance to the elite round, only the results of the third-placed teams against the first and second-placed teams in their group are taken into account.

Elite round
The draw for the elite round will be held  at the UEFA headquarters in Nyon, Switzerland.

Draw
The draw for the elite round will be held in spring 2022, at the UEFA headquarters in Nyon, Switzerland.

The teams were seeded according to their results in the qualifying round. The Netherlands and Spain, which received byes to the elite round, were automatically seeded into Pot A. Each group contained one team from Pot A, one team from Pot B, one team from Pot C, and one team from Pot D. Winners and runners-up from the same qualifying round group could not be drawn in the same group, but the best third-placed teams could be drawn in the same group as winners or runners-up from the same qualifying round group.

Groups

Group 1

Group 2

Group 3

Group 4

Group 5

Group 6

Group 7

Group 8

Ranking of second-placed teams
To determine the seven best second-placed teams from the elite round which qualify for the final tournament, only the results of the second-placed teams against the first and third-placed teams in their group are taken into account.

Qualified teams
The following 16 teams qualify for the final tournament.

1 Bold indicates champions for that year. Italic indicates hosts for that year.
2 As Yugoslavia
3 As Serbia and Montenegro

Goalscorers
In the qualifying round 

In the elite round 

In total,

References

External links

Under-17 Matches: 2022 Qualifying, UEFA.com

2021 in youth association football
2022 in youth association football
Association football events postponed due to the COVID-19 pandemic
Sports events affected by the 2022 Russian invasion of Ukraine